Ammonium perchlorate ("AP") is an inorganic compound with the formula NH4 ClO4.  It is a colorless or white solid that is soluble in water. It is a powerful oxidizer. Combined with a fuel, it can be used as a rocket propellant called ammonium perchlorate composite propellant. Its instability has involved it in a number of accidents, such as the PEPCON disaster.

Production
Ammonium perchlorate (AP) is produced by reaction between ammonia and perchloric acid.  This process is the main outlet for the industrial production of perchloric acid.  The salt also can be produced by salt metathesis reaction of ammonium salts with sodium perchlorate.  This process exploits the relatively low solubility of NH4ClO4, which is about 10% of that for sodium perchlorate.

AP crystallises as colorless rhombohedra.

Decomposition
Like most ammonium salts, ammonium perchlorate decomposes before melting. Mild heating results in production of hydrogen chloride, nitrogen, oxygen, and water.

 4 NH4ClO4 → 4 HCl + 2 N2 + 5 O2 + 6 H2O

The combustion of AP is quite complex and is widely studied. AP crystals decompose before melting, even though a thin liquid layer has been observed on crystal surfaces during high-pressure combustion processes. Strong heating may lead to explosions. Complete reactions leave no residue. Pure crystals cannot sustain a flame below the pressure of 2 MPa.

AP is a Class 4 oxidizer (can undergo an explosive reaction) for particle sizes over 15 micrometres and is classified as an explosive for particle sizes less than 15 micrometres.

Applications
The primary use of ammonium perchlorate is in making solid fuel propellants. When AP is mixed with a fuel (like a powdered aluminium and/or with an elastomeric binder), it can generate self-sustained combustion at pressures far below atmospheric pressure. It is an important oxidizer with a decades-long history of use in solid rocket propellants – space launch (including the Space Shuttle Solid Rocket Booster), military, amateur, and hobby high-power rockets, as well as in some fireworks.

Some "breakable" epoxy adhesives contain suspensions of AP.  Upon heating to 300 °C, the AP degrades the organic adhesive, breaking the cemented joint.

Toxicity
Perchlorate itself confers little acute toxicity. However, chronic exposure to perchlorates, even in low concentrations, has been shown to cause various thyroid problems, as it is taken up in place of iodine.

References
https://www.europapress.es/economia/noticia-comunicado-perclorato-amonio-web-ammoniumperchlorateorg-20200304141258.html

Ammonium compounds
Perchlorates
Pyrotechnic oxidizers
Rocket oxidizers
Oxidizing agents
Explosive chemicals